James "Jack" Peters was an association football player in the late nineteenth century. He played for Heywood Central of the Lancashire League until 1894, when he joined Newton Heath (the modern Manchester United). An outside left, he played 45 times for the "Heathens" in The Football League and scored 13 goals. In 1896 he joined New Brompton (the modern Gillingham) of the Southern Football League. He played in 19 of the club's 20 league matches in the 1896-97 season, scoring four goals, but moved on at the end of the season to Sheppey United. No further details of his career are known.

References

External links
MUFCInfo.com profile

Manchester United F.C. players
Gillingham F.C. players
Year of death missing
Southern Football League players
Year of birth missing
English footballers
Association football forwards